Eastern Highlands  is a highlands province of Papua New Guinea. The provincial capital is Goroka. The province covers an area of 11,157 km², and has a population of 579,825 (2011 census). The province shares a common administrative boundary with Madang Province to the north, Morobe Province to the east, Gulf Province to the south, and Simbu Province to the west. The province is the home of the Asaro mud mask that is displayed at shows and festivals within the province and in the country. The province is reachable by air, including Goroka Airport, and road transport, including the main Highlands Highway.

Districts and LLGs

Each province in Papua New Guinea has one or more districts, and each district has one or more Local Level Government (LLG) areas. For census purposes, the LLG areas are subdivided into wards and those into census units.

Demography
Eastern Highland Province had a population of 432,972 (PNG citizens) and 1,173 (non-citizens) in the 2000 Census. This is an increase of 31% since the 1990 Census figure.

Provincial leaders

The province was governed by a decentralised provincial administration, headed by a Premier, from 1977 to 1995. Following reforms taking effect that year, the national government reassumed some powers, and the role of Premier was replaced by a position of Governor, to be held by the winner of the province-wide seat in the National Parliament of Papua New Guinea.

Premiers (1976–1995)

Governors (1995–present)

Members of the National Parliament

The province and each district is represented by a Member of the National Parliament.  There is one provincial electorate and each district is an open electorate.

References

 https://web.archive.org/web/20080704101843/http://www.easternhighlands.com.pg/facts.htm
 State of the Province Document, 1994

 
Provinces of Papua New Guinea
Highlands Region